On 29 July 2019, a man murdered an eight-year-old boy in Frankfurt Hauptbahnhof, Germany.

Attack
On 29 July 2019, Habte Araya deliberately pushed an eight-year-old boy, Leo, and his mother, onto railway tracks. This happened on platform 7 of Frankfurt Hauptbahnhof, the main train station in Frankfurt, in the German state of Hesse, as an Intercity Express passenger train entered the station. The mother rolled herself off the tracks, avoiding the train; Leo was killed instantly when he was hit by the same train. Araya also tried to push a woman in her late seventies onto the tracks. All three victims were strangers to Araya, who was chased and apprehended by onlookers.

Perpetrator
At the time he carried out the attack, Araya was a 40 year-old married father-of-three from Eritrea. He was a refugee living in Switzerland who had been granted asylum there in 2009. He was on the run from Swiss police, who sought him for the false imprisonment of his wife and their three children earlier in July 2019.

Reaction
The attack was widely covered by Germany's media and also reported by the media in some other countries. It triggered a debate about immigration and crime, along with calls for increased security at train stations and Germany's international borders.

Legal proceedings
Araya was tried in August 2020, with the proceedings to decide whether it was manslaughter or murder. On 28 August, the attack was ruled to be murder and attempted murder. On the same day, he was sentenced to be detained for life; due to his acute paranoid schizophrenia, he was ruled not criminally responsible and sent to a psychiatric hospital.

References

2019 murders in Germany
2010s in Frankfurt
2020s trials
Attacks on transport
Crime in Frankfurt
July 2019 crimes in Europe
July 2019 events in Germany
Manslaughter trials
Murder in Hesse
Murder trials
Railway accidents and incidents in Germany
Trials in Germany